Mark the Evangelist (Ge'ez: ማርቆስ), also known as John Mark or Saint Mark, is the person who is traditionally ascribed to be the author of the Gospel of Mark. According to Church tradition, Mark founded the episcopal see of Alexandria, which was one of the five most important sees of early Christianity. His feast day is celebrated on April 25, and his symbol is the winged lion.

Mark's identity

According to William Lane (1974), an "unbroken tradition" identifies Mark the Evangelist with John Mark, and John Mark as the cousin of Barnabas. However, Hippolytus of Rome in On the Seventy Apostles distinguishes Mark the Evangelist (2 Tim 4:11), John Mark (Acts 12:12, 25; 13:5, 13; 15:37), and Mark the cousin of Barnabas (Col 4:10; Phlm 1:24). According to Hippolytus, they all belonged to the "Seventy Disciples" who were sent out by Jesus to disseminate the gospel (Luke 10:1ff.) in Judea.

According to Eusebius of Caesarea (Eccl. Hist. 2.9.1–4), Herod Agrippa I, in his first year of reign over the whole of Judea (AD 41), killed James, son of Zebedee and arrested Peter, planning to kill him after the Passover. Peter was saved miraculously by angels, and escaped out of the realm of Herod (Acts 12:1–19). Peter went to Antioch, then through Asia Minor (visiting the churches in Pontus, Galatia, Cappadocia, Asia, and Bithynia, as mentioned in 1 Peter 1:1), and arrived in Rome in the second year of Emperor Claudius (AD 42; Eusebius, Eccl, Hist. 2.14.6). Somewhere on the way, Peter encountered Mark and took him as travel companion and interpreter. Mark the Evangelist wrote down the sermons of Peter, thus composing the Gospel according to Mark (Eccl. Hist. 15–16), before he left for Alexandria in the third year of Claudius (AD 43).

According to the Acts 15:39, Mark went to Cyprus with Barnabas after the Council of Jerusalem.

According to tradition, in AD 49, about 19 years after the Ascension of Jesus, Mark travelled to Alexandria and founded the Church of Alexandria – today, the Coptic Orthodox Church, the Greek Orthodox Church of Alexandria, and the Coptic Catholic Church trace their origins to this original community. Aspects of the Coptic liturgy can be traced back to Mark himself. He became the first bishop of Alexandria and he is honored as the founder of Christianity in Africa.

According to Eusebius (Eccl. Hist. 2.24.1), Mark was succeeded by Anianus as the bishop of Alexandria in the eighth year of Nero (62/63), probably, but not definitely, due to his coming death. Later Coptic tradition says that he was martyred in 68.

Modern Bible scholars have concluded that the Gospel of Mark was written by an anonymous author rather than by Mark.

Biblical and traditional information
Evidence for Mark the Evangelist's authorship of the Gospel that bears his name originates with Papias (c. 60 – c. 130 AD). Scholars of the Trinity Evangelical Divinity School are "almost certain" that Papias is referencing John Mark. Modern mainstream Bible scholars find Papias's information difficult to interpret.

The Coptic Church accords with identifying Mark the Evangelist with John Mark, as well as that he was one of the Seventy Disciples sent out by Christ (Luke 10:1), as Hippolytus confirmed. Coptic tradition also holds that Mark the Evangelist hosted the disciples in his house after Jesus's death, that the resurrected Jesus Christ came to Mark's house (John 20), and that the Holy Spirit descended on the disciples at Pentecost in the same house. Furthermore, Mark is also believed to have been among the servants at the Marriage at Cana who poured out the water that Jesus turned to wine (John 2:1–11).

According to the Coptic tradition, Mark was born in Cyrene, a city in the Pentapolis of North Africa (now Libya). This tradition adds that Mark returned to Pentapolis later in life, after being sent by Paul to Colossae (Colossians 4:10; Philemon 24. Some, however, think these actually refer to Mark the Cousin of Barnabas), and serving with him in Rome (2 Tim 4:11); from Pentapolis he made his way to Alexandria.  When Mark returned to Alexandria, the pagans of the city resented his efforts to turn the Alexandrians away from the worship of their traditional gods. In AD 68, they placed a rope around his neck and dragged him through the streets until he was dead.

Veneration

The Feast of St Mark is observed on April 25 by the Catholic and Eastern Orthodox Churches. For those Churches still using the Julian Calendar, April 25 according to it aligns with May 8 on the Gregorian Calendar until the year 2099. The Coptic Orthodox Church observes the Feast of St Mark on Parmouti 30 according to the Coptic Calendar which always aligns with April 25 on the Julian Calendar or May 8 on the Gregorian Calendar.

Where John Mark is distinguished from Mark the Evangelist, John Mark is celebrated on September 27 (as in the Roman Martyrology) and Mark the Evangelist on April 25.

Mark is remembered in the Church of England and in much of the Anglican Communion, with a Festival on 25 April.

In art

Mark the Evangelist is most often depicted writing or holding his gospel. In Christian tradition, Mark the Evangelist is symbolized by a lion.

Mark the Evangelist attributes are the lion in the desert; he can be depicted as a bishop on a throne decorated with lions; as a man helping Venetian sailors. He is often depicted holding a book with pax tibi Marce written on it or holding a palm and book. Other depictions of Mark show him as a man with a book or scroll, accompanied by a winged lion. The lion might also be associated with Jesus' Resurrection because lions were believed to sleep with open eyes, thus a comparison with Christ in his tomb, and Christ as king.

Mark the Evangelist can be depicted as a man with a halter around his neck and as rescuing Christian slaves from Saracens.

Major shrines
 Basilica di San Marco (Venice, Italy)
 Saint Mark's Coptic Orthodox Cathedral (Alexandria, Egypt)
 Saint Mark's Church (Serbian Orthodox) in Belgrade, Serbia
 Saint Mark's Coptic Orthodox Cathedral (Cairo, Egypt)
 St. Mark's Church in-the-Bowery, New York City

See also
 Baucalis
 Feast of Saint Mark
 Gospel of John
 Gospel of Luke
 Gospel of Mark
 Gospel of Matthew
 John the Evangelist
 Luke the Evangelist
 Rogation days
 Saint Mark the Evangelist, patron saint archive

References

Citations

Bibliography

 

 

12 births
68 deaths
1st-century Popes and Patriarchs of Alexandria
1st-century Christian martyrs
1st-century writers
Burials at Saint Mark's Coptic Orthodox Cathedral (Alexandria)
Christian missionaries in Africa
Early Jewish Christians
Gospel of Mark
Saints from Roman Egypt
People in Acts of the Apostles
Christian writers
Seventy disciples
Year of birth unknown
Four Evangelists
Body snatching
Anglican saints